Gustav Heynhold (or Gustav Heinhold; 1800–1860) was a German botanist who worked at the botanic gardens of Dresden and Frankfurt.

In 1828 he was in Trieste where he carried out mapping and published "Uebersicht der Vegetation in den Umgebungen Triest's; von Hrn. Gustav Heynhold zu Dresden." His best-known work was the Nomenclator Botanicus Hortensis, an index of the botanical names of garden plants. It is not certain whether he had an academic degree or title. In 1846 the "Botanischen Centralblatt für Deutschland" listed him as a private scholar in Dresden. In total he was responsible for naming some 426 plant species.

In 1841, he renamed Arabis thaliana as Arabidopsis thaliana (L.) Heynh. Arabidopsis was the first plant to have its genome sequenced, and is frequently used as a model for understanding the molecular biology of many plant traits, including flower development and light sensing.

Works
 Das natürliche Pflanzensystem : ein Versuch, die gegenseitigen Verwandtschaften der Pflanzen aufzufinden ... : mit Berücksichtigung der arzneilichen und überhaupt anwendbaren Gewächse, nebst einer historischen Einleitung, Publisher : Dresden ; Leipzig : in der Arnoldischen Buchhandlung, 1840.
 Nomenclator Botanicus Hortensis in 2 parts
 Flora von Sachsen ...wildwachsenden und allgemein angebauten Pflanzen Dresden; Verlag: J. Naumann 1842
 Flora oder Botanische Zeitung. Nro. 42. Regensburg, 1829 - Uebersicht der Vegetation in den Umgebungen Triest's; von Hrn. Gustav Heynhold zu Dresden.
 Flora von Sachsen : Clavis generum : eine synoptische Darstellung der zu diesem Florengebiet gehörigen Gattungen der ersten Abtheilung (der Phanerogamen), zum erleichterten Bestimmen, nebst einem deutschen Register derselben
 Die Rhodoraceae oder Rhododendreae : eine Anleitung zur Cultur dieser Pflanzenfamilie, Traugott Jakob Seidel (1833- 1896) und Gustav Haynhold, Arnoldische Buchhandlung; erste Auflage 1843; zweite Auflage 1846
 Kryptogamie, Heinrich David August Ficinus; Gustav Heynhold; C Schubert - Arnoldsche Buchh. 1823

See also

References

External links
 
 Gustav Heynhold on ipni.org

19th-century German botanists
1800 births
1860 deaths